Cryptoblepharus nigropunctatus, known as the Ogasawara snake-eyed skink, is a species of lizard in the family Scincidae. It is endemic to the Ogasawara Islands of Japan.

References

Cryptoblepharus
Reptiles of Japan
Endemic fauna of Japan
Reptiles described in 1861
Taxa named by Edward Hallowell (herpetologist)